The Alphabet of Hurricanes is the fifth studio album from British singer-songwriter Tom McRae.  It was released on 22 February 2010.

Track listing

 Still Love You 
 A Is For... 
 Won't Lie 
 Summer of John Wayne 
 Told My Troubles to the River 
 American Spirit 
 Please 
 Out of the Walls 
 Me and Stetson 
 Can't Find You 
 Best Winter 
 Fifteen Miles Downriver
 Opposite of Love (iTunes Bonus Track)

References

2010 albums
Tom McRae albums
Cooking Vinyl albums